The Beerhouse Act 1830 (11 Geo 4. and 1 Will 4. c. 64) was an Act of the Parliament of the United Kingdom, which liberalised the regulations governing the brewing and sale of beer. It was modified by subsequent legislation and finally repealed in 1993. It was one of the Licensing Acts 1828 to 1886.

Background 
The precursor to the Act was the Alehouse Act 1828 (9 Geo.4 c.61), that was enacted two years before, which established a general annual licensing meeting to be held in every city, town, division, county and riding, for the purposes of granting licences to inns, alehouses and victualling (i.e. provision of food) houses to sell exciseable liquors to be drunk on the premises.

The Act 
The Act enabled any rate-payer to brew and sell beer on payment of a licence costing two guineas (£2.10 in decimal currency, not adjusted for inflation). The intention was to increase competition between brewers; lowering prices and encouraging people to drink beer instead of strong spirits. It resulted in the opening of thousands of new public houses and breweries throughout the country, particularly in the rapidly expanding industrial centres of the north of England.  According to the Act, Parliament considered it was

Legacy 
The Act's supporters hoped that by increasing competition in the brewing and sale of beer, and thus lowering its price, the population might be weaned off more alcoholic drinks such as gin. But it proved to be controversial, removing as it did the monopoly of local magistrates to lucratively regulate local trade in alcohol, and not applying retrospectively to those who already ran public houses. It was also denounced as promoting drunkenness.

The passage of the Act during the reign of King William IV led to many taverns and public houses being named in his honour; he remains "the most popular monarch among pub names".

By 1841 licences under the new law had been issued to 45,500 commercial brewers. One factor in the Act was the dismantling of provisions for detailed recording of licences, which were restored by subsequent regulatory legislation: the Wine and Beerhouse Act 1869 and the Wine and Beerhouse Act Amendment Act 1870. The Act was often amended, notably in 1834 and 1840.

Repeal 
The final remaining provisions of the Act were repealed on 11 November 1993, by the Statute Law (Repeals) Act 1993 (1993 c. 50), s. 1(1), Sch. 1 Pt. XIII GroupI.

References

Citations

Notes

Bibliography

*
Mason, Nicholas. (2001) “‘The Sovereign People are in A Beastly State’: The Beer Act Of 1830 and Victorian Discourse on Working-Class Drunkenness.” Victorian Literature and Culture 29, no. 1 (2001): 109–27.

*

United Kingdom Acts of Parliament 1830
Pubs in the United Kingdom
Alcohol law in the United Kingdom